The 1953–54 Bradford City A.F.C. season was the 41st in the club's history.

The club finished 5th in Division Three North, and reached the 1st round of the FA Cup.

Sources

References

Bradford City A.F.C. seasons
Bradford City